Humberto de Campos is a municipality in the state of Maranhão in the Northeast region of Brazil. It is named after the Brazilian writer Humberto de Campos.

The municipality contains part of the  Upaon-Açu/Miritiba/Alto Preguiças Environmental Protection Area, created in 1992.

See also
List of municipalities in Maranhão

References

Municipalities in Maranhão
Populated coastal places in Maranhão